General elections were held in India in 1984 soon after the assassination of previous Prime Minister, Indira Gandhi, though the vote in Assam and Punjab was delayed until 1985 due to ongoing fighting.

The election was a landslide victory for the Indian National Congress of Rajiv Gandhi (son of Indira Gandhi),  which won 404 of the 514 seats elected in 1984 and a further 10 in the delayed elections. The Telugu Desam Party of N. T. Rama Rao, a regional political party from the southern state of Andhra Pradesh, was the second-largest party, winning 30 seats, thus achieving the distinction of becoming the first regional party to become a national opposition party. Voting was held immediately after the assassination of Indira Gandhi and the 1984 anti-Sikh riots in November and most of India supported Congress.
The Bharatiya Janata Party won its first two seats, in Hanamkonda and Mahesana.

Congress wins 24 seats, Janata party and BJP wins only one each.

Party-wise results summary

Results- Constituency wise

References

Indian general elections in Gujarat
Gujarat
1980s in Gujarat